Jonas Björkman and John McEnroe were the defending champions, but did not participate this year.

Eric Butorac and Jamie Murray won the title, defeating Chris Haggard and Rainer Schüttler 7–5, 7–6(8–6) in the final.

Seeds

Draw

Draw

External links
 Draw

Doubles